Miami Northwestern Senior High School is a public four-year high school located in Miami, Florida, United States

History

Academics 
Northwestern has long been known for its academic challenges; however, the school has shown an unprecedented turn-around over the last several years. Since the implementation of the Florida School Accountability Report, Northwestern had received a "D" or "F" for the 12 consecutive years between 1998 and 2010, with four "F" grades in the 2001–02, 2002–03, 2006–07, and 2008–09 school years. During that time, Miami Northwestern was labeled one of the 163 "dropout factories" in the state of Florida by a Johns Hopkins University study of retention rates of students from their freshman to senior years. Using data from the 2004, 2005, and 2006 school years, the study found that 59% of entering freshman had dropped out or transferred before their senior year. Only 41% of the entering class had progressed to earn diplomas. As of the 2010–11 school year, the graduation rate had doubled to 81%.

In 2010–11, Miami Northwestern received a "B" on the School Accountability Report, the highest grade ever received by an inner-city school in Miami-Dade County. This improvement has been attributed in part to a major overhaul in school staff, and to an increased focus on college readiness and college-level courses. To further these efforts, Florida International University has partnered with Northwestern to help foster a successful community school. The initiative, funded by $1 million from JPMorgan Chase, will focus on increased dual-enrollment offerings, financial literacy, service learning, and the construction of an aquaponics laboratory at the school.

In 2015 Miami Northwestern finally received an "A" rating from the State of Florida.

Demographics 
Miami Northwestern is 90% Black, 9% Hispanic, and 1% White.

Performing and Visual Arts Center (PAVAC) magnet program 
The Performing and Visual Arts magnet program at Miami Northwestern was started in 1975 by Marcy Sarmiento. In 1982, the program was the starting point for PAVAC, the influential dual-enrollment joint program with Miami-Dade Community College, which later became the New World School of the Arts. The Visual and Performing Arts magnets within the Miami-Dade county school system are competitive entry programs requiring a portfolio or audition, and are open to all students across the school system. In January 2007, twenty students from Miami Northwestern High School's Performing and Visual Arts Center drama class were awarded "Best Florida Film" at the 2006 Ft. Lauderdale International Film Festival: High School Film Competition for their short film, directed by Jabari Payne, A New Love. Marcus Isaac, the film's producer and editor, was awarded the 2006 Miami Dade Mayor's Office of Film & Entertainment: Student Filmmaker Award. The students, members of the in-school CINEMA program of the Florida Film Institute, a non-profit organization mentoring more than 4,200 aspiring young filmmakers throughout Miami-Dade and Broward counties, screened their film at the Romance in a Can Film Festival in February 2007 at the Byron Carlyle Theatre on Miami Beach.

Athletics

Controversy 
On December 7, 2006 senior star running back of the football team Antwain Easterling was arrested and charged with lewd and lascivious battery on a minor for having sex with a fourteen-year-old girl in a bathroom at Miami Northwestern High School three months earlier. The girl's mother had reported the incident to three faculty members at the school in October 2006 and one of them reportedly informed the principal Dwight Bernard. The proper authorities were not notified and it did not come to the attention of Miami-Dade school police until the mother of the fourteen year-old asked an unknowing member of the police staff how the investigation was proceeding. Also arrested in the incident and charged with the same offense were Dante Maurice Jefferson and Vincent Shannon Jefferson.

After it was revealed that several members of the schools administration, faculty, and the football teams coaching staff knew about the incident and failed to report it, Miami-Dade Schools Superintendent Rudy Crew fired a total of twenty-one people including Miami Northwestern Principal Dwight Bernard, Head Football Coach Roland Smith and his entire staff, and many other school employees. In addition, athletics director Gregory Killings resigned. The football team was also placed on probation for one-year instead of having the entire 2007 season canceled. Bernard was indicted by a grand jury in March 2007 with official misconduct for covering up the incident. The grand jury report said school officials "allowed for the glory of football to trump the needs and safety" of the victim and that "priorities were chosen and the little girl lost." It was later reported that the mother of the young girl made contact with members of the school administration over 30 times but the incident was never reported to Miami-Dade police as required by state and federal law.

Easterling was allowed to enroll in a pretrial diversionary program which included 26 weeks of counseling sessions that would allow him to avoid prosecution and have the charges against him dismissed upon the completion of the program. Though he had been heavily recruited by schools like the University of Miami, the University of Florida, and Notre Dame these schools lost interest and walked away. He was finally recruited by The University of Southern Mississippi.

On April 20, 2010, a Miami-Dade jury found former Miami Northwestern Principal Dwight Bernard not guilty after the trial on the sex scandal coverup. During the trial, Bernard took the stand in his own defense and told the jury that he was ordered by school board members not to suspend Easterling.  After his acquittal, Bernard sued the Miami Dade school board for $329,000.

Football 
Prior to the 2007 season, the Miami Northwestern Bulls had won three class 6A state championships. In its third game of the 2007 football season, the Bulls, ranked No. 1 by USA Today, traveled to Dallas, Texas to take on the #2 nationally ranked Southlake Dragons. A crowd of 31,896 at Gerald J. Ford Stadium watched as Miami Northwestern won the contest 29-21, thereby ending Southlake's 49-game winning streak (tied Abilene for the longest in Texas high school football history). The Bulls then completed an undefeated season capping it off with a 41-0 win in the Florida 6A state championship game and being declared the mythical national champions by ESPN and USA Today.

Track and field 
 The Bulls have also excelled in track and field, with the boys finishing in the top of the Florida state 4A track and field championships for the past 10 years. In 2001, 2005, 2006, and 2007, the girls won the Florida High School Athletic Association's 4A track and field championship.  In 2007–2008, in the 400 meter event, the girls swept 1st, 2nd, and 3rd with two freshman sprinters.

Notable alumni 

 Tutu Atwell - Wide Receiver for the  Los Angeles Rams
 Deandre Baker - NFL cornerback 
 Teddy Bridgewater - Quarterback for the Miami Dolphins
 Artie Burns - Cornerback for the Seattle Seahawks
 Amari Cooper - Wide Receiver for the Cleveland Browns
 Trick Daddy - American rapper
 Lavonte David - Linebacker for the Tampa Bay Buccaneers
 Marcus Forston - Former NFL defensive tackle 
 Anthony Gaitor - Former NFL cornerback
 Jacory Harris - Former quarterback in the CFL
 Barry Jenkins - Academy Award winning filmmaker
 Mickey Rivers - Former baseball player for the California Angels, New York Yankees and Texas Rangers.
 Eli Rogers - Former wide receiver for the Pittsburgh Steelers
 Brianna Rollins-McNeal - Olympic gold medalist hurdler 
 Sean Spence - Former NFL linebacker
 Tommy Streeter - Former NFL wide receiver 
 Twanisha Terry - American Sprinter
 Katrina Laverne Taylor - Rapper known professionally as "Trina"
 Tray Walker - Former cornerback for the Baltimore Ravens
 Brandon Washington - Former NFL offensive tackle
 Rachad Wildgoose - Cornerback for the Washington Commanders

See also 

 Miami-Dade County Public Schools

References

External links 
 
 Miami-Dade County Public Schools
 Miami Northwestern's greatschools.net page

1955 establishments in Florida
Educational institutions established in 1955
Miami-Dade County Public Schools high schools